Justine Gail Robbeson (born 15 May 1985 in Benoni) is a South African athlete who specialised in the javelin throw. She previously competed in the heptathlon, achieving a personal best of 5868 in 2004. Justine attended Springs Girls' High School. She completed her BSc degree in Nutrition and Human Movement Sciences, BSc Honours degree in Nutrition, and MSc degree in Sports Nutrition at North-West University, Potchefstroom, where she was a member of the athletics club coached by Terseus Liebenberg.

Her personal best javelin throw is 63.49 metres, achieved in February 2008 in Potchefstroom. It was an African record until July 2009, when her compatriot Sunette Viljoen threw 65.46 metres at the qualifying round of the 2009 Summer Universiade in Belgrade, Serbia.

Achievements

References

External links

1985 births
Living people
People from Benoni
South African female javelin throwers
Athletes (track and field) at the 2008 Summer Olympics
Olympic athletes of South Africa
Athletes (track and field) at the 2010 Commonwealth Games
South African people of British descent
North-West University alumni
Commonwealth Games medallists in athletics
Commonwealth Games bronze medallists for South Africa
African Games gold medalists for South Africa
African Games medalists in athletics (track and field)
Universiade medalists in athletics (track and field)
Athletes (track and field) at the 2003 All-Africa Games
Athletes (track and field) at the 2007 All-Africa Games
Athletes (track and field) at the 2011 All-Africa Games
Universiade bronze medalists for South Africa
Medalists at the 2005 Summer Universiade
Medalists at the 2011 Summer Universiade
Sportspeople from Gauteng
Medallists at the 2010 Commonwealth Games